Below are the rosters for the Copa América 1991 tournament in Chile, from 6 to 21 July 1991.

Group A

Argentina
Head coach: Alfio Basile

Chile
Head coach: Arturo Salah

Paraguay
Head coach: Carlos Alberto Kiese

Peru
Head coach: Miguel Company

Venezuela
Head coach:

Group B

Bolivia
Head coach: Ramiro Blacut

Brazil
Head coach: Falcão

Colombia
Head coach:

Ecuador
Head coach:  Dušan Drašković

Uruguay
Head coach: Luis Alberto Cubilla

References
Los que aspiran a dar la sorpresa, El Mundo Deportivo, 7 July 1991, p. 25. 
RSSSF Archive

Squads
Copa América squads